

Awards and honors

Awards won
Emmy Awards:
 Outstanding Individual Achievement in Sound Editing for a Series for "Heaven" (1992)
 Outstanding Individual Achievement in Cinematography for a Series Constantine Makris for "Conspiracy" (1993)
 Outstanding Guest Actress – Drama Series Elaine Stritch for "Point of View" (1993)
 Outstanding Cinematography for a Series Constantine Makris for "Mad Dog" (1997)
 Outstanding Drama Series (1997)
 Outstanding Cinematography for a Series Constantine Makris for "Stalker" (1998)

Screen Actors Guild:
 Outstanding Male Actor in a Drama Series Sam Waterston (1999)
 Outstanding Male Actor in a Drama Series Jerry Orbach (2005) – posthumously awarded

Edgar Awards:
 Best Episode in a Television Series Teleplay René Balcer and Michael S. Chernuchin, for "Conspiracy" (1993)
 Best Episode in a Television Series Teleplay I. C. Rapoport and Ed Zuckerman, for "Deadbeat" (1997)
 Best Episode in a Television Series Teleplay Richard Sweren, Shimon Wincelberg, and Ed Zuckerman, for "Double Down" (1998)
 Best Episode in a Television Series Teleplay René Balcer and Richard Sweren, for "Bad Girl" (1999)
 Best Episode in a Television Series Teleplay René Balcer, for "Refuge, Part 2" (2000)

Writers Guild Award
 Best Teleplay, Rene Balcer and Richard Sweren for "Entrapment" (1998)

Silver Gavel Award (American Bar Association)
 Best Television Episode, "DWB", written by Rene Balcer  (1998)
 Best Television Episode, "Hate", written by Rene Balcer (1999)

Peabody Award, 1997

Norman Felton Award (Producers Guild of America), Producer of the Year, (1996)

NAACP Image Awards:
 Outstanding Supporting Actress in a Drama Series S. Epatha Merkerson (2007, 2010, 2011)

Awards nominated

Emmy Awards:
 Outstanding Drama Series (1992–1996, 1998–2002)
 Outstanding Lead Actor in a Drama Series Sam Waterston (1997, 1999–2000)
 Outstanding Lead Actor in a Drama Series Jerry Orbach (2000)
 Outstanding Lead Actor in a Drama Series Michael Moriarty (1991–1994)
 Outstanding Lead Actress in a Drama Series Shirley Knight (guest appearance) (1992)
 Outstanding Supporting Actor in a Drama Series Steven Hill (1998–1999)
 Outstanding Supporting Actor in a Drama Series Benjamin Bratt (1998)
 Outstanding Supporting Actress in a Drama Series Barbara Barrie (guest appearance) (1992)
 Outstanding Guest Actress in a Drama Series Tovah Feldshuh (2003)
 Outstanding Guest Actress in a Drama Series Jane Alexander (2000)
 Outstanding Guest Actress in a Drama Series Julia Roberts (1999)
 Outstanding Directing for a Drama Series Matthew Penn for "Empire" (1999)
 Outstanding Directing for a Drama Series Edwin Sherin for "Sideshow, Parts 1 & 2" (crossover episode with Homicide: Life on the Street)(1999)
 Outstanding Individual Achievement in Directing in a Drama Series for "Conspiracy" Edwin Sherin (1993)
 Outstanding Individual Achievement in Writing in a Drama Series for "Manhood" Robert Nathan & Walon Green (1993)
 Outstanding Cinematography for a Series for "Endurance" John Beymer
 Outstanding Cinematography for a Series for "Entitled, Part II" Constantine Makris (2000)
 Outstanding Editing for a Series – Single Camera Production for "Judgment in L.A. Part II" David Siegel (1997)
 Outstanding Individual Achievement in Editing for a Series – Single Camera Production for "Sanctuary" Billy Fox and Laurie Grotstein (1994)
 Outstanding Individual Achievement in Editing for a Series – Single Camera Production for "Misconception" Arthur W. Forney (1992)
 Outstanding Single Camera Sound Mixing for a Series for "School Daze" (2001)
 Outstanding Sound Mixing for a Series for "Gunshow" (2000)
 Outstanding Sound Mixing for a Series for "Empire" (1999)
 Outstanding Sound Mixing for a Series for "D-Girl" (1997)
 Outstanding Individual Achievement in Sound Editing for a Series for "Hot Pursuit"  (1996)
 Outstanding Casting for a Series (2002)
 Outstanding Casting for a Series (2001)
 Outstanding Casting for a Series (2000)
 Outstanding Casting for a Series (1999)
 Outstanding Casting for a Series (1998)
 Outstanding Costume Design for a Series for "Refuge, Parts 1 & 2" Jennifer von Mayrhauser (1999)

NAACP Image Awards:
 Outstanding Supporting Actress in a Drama Series S. Epatha Merkerson (1997–2001, 2007–2008)
 Outstanding Actor in a Drama Series Anthony Anderson (2010, 2011)

Golden Globe Awards:
 Best TV Series-Drama (1992, 1994–1995, 1998–1999)
 Best Performance by an Actor in a Drama Series-Drama Sam Waterston (1995)
 Best Performance by an Actor in a Drama Series-Drama Michael Moriarty (1994)

Screen Actors Guild:
 Outstanding Performance by an Ensemble in a Drama Series (1995–2002, 2004)
 Outstanding Male Actor in a Drama Series Sam Waterston (1998)

Edgar Awards:
 Best Episode in a Television Series Teleplay David Black & Robert Nathan, for "Happily Ever After" (1991)

Notes

Law & Order (franchise)
Lists of awards by television series